The AN/TRC-80 Radio Terminal Set was a United States Army communications system that provided line-of-sight or tropospheric scatter voice and teletypewriter communications between Pershing missile firing units and higher headquarters. Commonly known as the "Track 80", it was built by Collins Radio and first delivered in 1960.

It provided five voice and one FSK teletypewriter channels. The voice channels were not secure, but teletypewriter channel could be secured by using the KW-7 Electronic Teletypewriter Security Equipment. The frequency range was 4.4–5.0 GHz with a power output of 1 kW.

It used the AS-1270/TRC-80 8 Foot Parabolic Antenna, an inflatable dish antenna that was stored in a recessed space in the roof of the shelter. The  TRC-80 shelter was carried on an M474 tracked vehicle with Pershing 1; with Pershing 1a it was carried on the Ford M656 tractor by the U.S. Army and on a 5-ton Magirus-Deutz tractor by the German Air Force.

With the introduction of Pershing II, the TRC-80 was replaced by the AN/TRC-184 Radio Terminal Set and the AN/MSC-6 Satellite Communication Terminal.

See also
 M-numbers
 List of military electronics of the United States

References

External links
 

Military radio systems of the United States
Military electronics of the United States
Pershing missile
Military equipment introduced in the 1960s